Catocala blandula, the charming underwing, is a moth of the family Erebidae. The species was first described by George Duryea Hulst in 1884. It is found in North America from Nova Scotia west to central Alberta, south to Pennsylvania and Wisconsin.

The wingspan is 42–50 mm. Adults are on wing from July to September depending on the location.

The larvae feed on Amelanchier, Malus sylvestris and Crataegus.

Subspecies
Catocala blandula manitobensis, recorded from Manitoba, is now considered a synonym.

References

External links

Oehlke, Bill "Catocala blandula Hulst, 1884". Catocala. Archived from the original September 27, 2013.

blandula
Moths of North America
Moths described in 1884